Raymond Künzli (born 1 September 1984) is a retired Swiss professional road racing cyclist. Born in St-Imier, Bern, Künzli currently resides in Sonvilier, Bern, Switzerland.

Palmarès
Sources:

2010
8th, Overall, Cinturón a Mallorca
2011
3rd, Overall, Cinturón a Mallorca

References

External links 
Official website

Cycling Base: Raymond Künzli
Cycling Quotient: Raymond Künzli
ProCyclingStats: Raymond Künzli
SpiderTech-C10: Raymond Künzli

Swiss male cyclists
1984 births
Living people
Sportspeople from the canton of Bern